Lisa Vasa Misipeka (born January 3, 1975) is an American Samoan athlete who specialises in the hammer throw. She was the first woman to represent American Samoa at the Olympics.

She won the bronze medal at the 1999 World Championships in Athletics. First place was 75.20m, second place 72.56m, and 9m behind first and 6.5m behind second was Misipeka in third with 66.06m. It was the first ever international medal for American Samoa, and the greatest difference in distance between the first three medal places. The flag bearer for American Samoa at the 2004 Olympic Games in Athens, Greece where she did not record a distance in the qualifying round of the women's hammer due to a knee injury and therefore did not advance to the final.

Achievements

References

External links
 
 

1975 births
Living people
American people of Samoan descent
American Samoan hammer throwers
Athletes (track and field) at the 1996 Summer Olympics
Athletes (track and field) at the 2000 Summer Olympics
Athletes (track and field) at the 2004 Summer Olympics
Olympic track and field athletes of American Samoa
South Carolina Gamecocks women's track and field athletes
University of South Carolina alumni
World Athletics Championships medalists
American Samoan female track and field athletes
Female hammer throwers
World Athletics Championships athletes for American Samoa